Charles of Anjou (count, 1246–1285) was King of Sicily from 1266 to 1285.

Charles of Anjou may also refer to:
Charles II of Anjou (count, 1285–1290), also king of Naples
Charles III of Anjou (count, 1290–1325), also count of Valois
Charles IV of Anjou (duke, 1480–1481), also count of Provence

See also
Count of Anjou
Duke of Anjou